Tau Piscis Austrini (τ Piscis Austrini) is a solitary, yellow-white hued star in the southern constellation of Piscis Austrinus. It is visible to the naked eye with an apparent visual magnitude of +4.9. Based upon an annual parallax shift of 54.71 mas as seen from the Earth, the star is located 59.6 light years from the Sun.

This is an F-type main sequence star with a stellar classification of F6 V. It is about 1.3 billion years old with a projected rotational velocity of 14 km/s and exhibits a low level of activity. The star has an estimated 1.34 times the mass of the Sun and 1.45 times the Sun's radius. It is radiating 2.82 times the solar luminosity from its photosphere at an effective temperature of 6,324 K. This star is a candidate for hosting a debris disk, as it displayed an initial near infrared excess that faded with further observations.

Naming

References

F-type main-sequence stars
Piscis Austrini, Tau
Piscis Austrinus
Durchmusterung objects
Piscis Austrini, 15
210302
109422
8447